Gino Demon (born 9 May 1997) is a Dutch professional footballer who plays for VVSB, as a centre-back.

Club career
Demon joined NAC from his Haarlem hometown amateur club EDO in 2015. In June 2017 he moved to Jong FC Utrecht.

References

1997 births
Living people
Footballers from Haarlem
Association football defenders
Dutch footballers
HFC Haarlem players
HFC EDO players
NAC Breda players
Jong FC Utrecht players
Rijnsburgse Boys players
VVSB players
Eerste Divisie players
Tweede Divisie players